"Joy to the World" is a song written by Hoyt Axton and made famous by the band Three Dog Night. The song is also popularly known by its opening lyric, "Jeremiah was a bullfrog". Three Dog Night originally released the song on their fourth studio album, Naturally, in November 1970, and subsequently released an edited version of the song as a single in February 1971.

The song, which has been described by members of Three Dog Night as a "kid's song" and a "silly song", topped the singles charts in North America, was certified gold by the RIAA, and has since been covered by multiple artists.

The song is featured prominently in the film The Big Chill. It is sung by a child character at the beginning and the Three Dog Night recording is played over the end credits. The song's refrain is used by Mariah Carey in her 1994 recording of the Christmas hymn "Joy to the World".

It is also played at the end of every Denver Broncos home victory. Notable playings of this song after Broncos victories included then-Chicago Bears head coach Abe Gibron's singing along with the song in 1973; and at the end of Super Bowl XXXII, played at Qualcomm Stadium in San Diego. It was also played at the end of Super Bowl XXXIII at Pro Player (now Hard Rock) Stadium in Miami Gardens, Florida and Super Bowl 50 in Santa Clara, California.
 
The song is also referenced directly in the Rolling Stone'''s publication of Fear and Loathing in 1971, where Raoul Duke (Hunter S. Thompson's fictional counterpart) walks into his hotel room to realize that his attorney is submerged in green bath tub water alone while blasting "Jeremiah was a bullfrog" at full volume.

 Background and recording 
Some of the words are nonsensical. Axton wanted to persuade his record producers to record a new melody he had written, and the producers asked him to sing any words to the tune. A member of Three Dog Night said that the original lyrics to the song were "Jeremiah was a prophet" but no one liked it.

When Hoyt Axton performed the song to the group, two of the three main vocalists – Danny Hutton and Cory Wells – rejected the song, but Chuck Negron felt that the band needed a "silly song" to help bring the band back together as a working unit. Negron also felt that the song "wasn't even close to our best record, but it might have been one of our most honest."

The song was recorded by Three Dog Night at American Recording Company, produced by Richard Podolor, and engineered by Bill Cooper. Unlike most Three Dog Night songs recorded at that point, instead of having just the three main vocalists singing harmony, the song was recorded with all seven members of the band singing. Drummer Floyd Sneed sings the deep lyric "I wanna tell you" towards the end of the song.

When the song hit number one on the US Billboard Hot 100 in 1971, Axton and his mother, Mae Axton, became the first mother and son to each have written a number one pop single in the rock era. Mae Axton co-wrote "Heartbreak Hotel", which was the first number one hit for Elvis Presley.

In a 1994 case, David P. Jackson filed suit claiming co-authorship of the song and alleging that Axton fraudulently claimed sole authorship. In the suit, Jackson claimed that Axton regularly credited him with co-authorship. The United States Court of Appeals for the Ninth Circuit ruled in favor of Axton.

 Personnel 

 Cory Wells – background vocals
 Chuck Negron – lead vocals, background vocals
 Danny Hutton – background vocals
 Mike Allsup – background vocals, guitar
 Joe Schermie – background vocals, bass guitar
 Jimmy Greenspoon – background vocals, keyboards
 Floyd Sneed – background vocals, drums

Charts and awards

Weekly charts

Year-end charts

All-time charts

The single had been out less than two months, when on April 9, 1971, "Joy to the World" was certified gold by the Recording Industry Association of America, for shipments of over one million units across the United States. The record was also given a Gold Leaf award by RPM magazine for sales of over a million units. The record won the award for the Best Selling Hit Single Record by the National Association of Recording Merchandisers in March 1972.
It was also ranked by Billboard magazine as the #1 pop single of 1971. The song was also nominated for a Grammy Award for Best Pop Vocal Performance by a Duo Or Group during the 14th Grammy Awards.

The single went on to sell 5 million copies worldwide.

Cover versions
Little Richard recorded a cover of the song for his 1971 album, The King of Rock and Roll, with a lengthy spoken intro and outro in the style of Black sermonic tradition preaching.

Certifications

In popular culture
In 1998 the song was referenced in Muppets Tonight during the episode "Andie MacDowell".
 In 2004 former Lizzie McGuire stars Hilary Duff and Davida Williams covered the song in their movie Raise Your Voice. 
 Singer-songwriter Daniel Johnston liked the song, which inspired his own character Jeremiah the bullfrog, whom he often drew in his artwork and advertisements. The frog is also featured on the cover of his album Hi, How Are You (1983) and has become an official music mascot for Johnston.
 The song was performed by the cast of ZOOM during season 3.
 It is sung by the son of one of the main characters at the start of the film The Big Chill (1983) and is featured on the soundtrack.
 The song was included in the film Forrest Gump and its soundtrack.
 In The X-Files TV series ("Detour" - S05E04), Scully sings the song to a wounded Mulder in the forest at night.
 Opening theme song for 2002 Fuji TV series Lunch no Joō, starring Yūko Takeuchi and Satoshi Tsumabuki.
 In English translations of Animal Crossing, there is a blue frog named Jeremiah (known as Quattro in its original Japanese), his English name coming from the first lyric.
 In Sex and the City (S02E10),  Carrie and her friend Jeremiah sing the song while drunk.
 In Friends (S09E13), Chandler sings the song at the karaoke.
 It is played during the end credits of the R-rated animated film, Sausage Party (2016).
 It appears in 2017 and 2018 TV commercials for Big Lots.
 The song appeared frequently in the movie 28 Days, including when Gwen Cummings (Sandra Bullock) finishes her stint in court-mandated rehab.
 It is played during the end credits of Drowning Mona.
 There is a short fantasy story by John A. Pitts, titled Jeremiah was a Bullfrog, which reimagines the song.
 In Outlander TV series, season 5, episode 2, character Roger McKenzie sings the song to his baby son Jeremiah.
 Appears in the J.C. Penney 2020 seasonal holiday TV advertising campaign.
 In April 2006, the cast of Nickelodeon series Dora the Explorer and Go, Diego, Go! covered the song on the album Diego, Dora & Friends' Animals Jamboree.
 In September 2010, Nickelodeon covered the song again, this time with the Wonder Pets! for the 2010 Mega Music Fest.
 The song and band are referenced by the American folk-rock group Fruit Bats in their song, "Singing Joy to the World," off their album, The Ruminant Band''.
 The song appeared in the Cosmic Mix Vol. 1 of the Guardians of Galaxy series. It was featured in the very end of the episode "Bad Moon Rising".

References

External links
 

1971 singles
Three Dog Night songs
Dunhill Records singles
Songs written by Hoyt Axton
Billboard Hot 100 number-one singles
Cashbox number-one singles
RPM Top Singles number-one singles
Number-one singles in South Africa
1970 songs
Denver Broncos
American children's songs